Gilmer is an unincorporated community in Gilmer County, West Virginia, United States. Gilmer had a post office, which opened on November 28, 1905, and closed on November 2, 2002.

References

Unincorporated communities in Gilmer County, West Virginia
Unincorporated communities in West Virginia